Calvander is a rural unincorporated community in southeastern Orange County, North Carolina, United States, located north-northwest of Carrboro. It lies at the intersection of Old Highway 86 and Homestead/Dairyland Road.

Calvander was named as a contraction of the name of Calvin Andrews, who founded the Andrews Academy, a 19th-century schoolhouse lying near the site of the current intersection. A map dated to 1891 identifies the community as including a saw mill, post office, and store. The crossroads currently houses a 76 gas station.

References

Unincorporated communities in Orange County, North Carolina
Unincorporated communities in North Carolina